Oliver Kelly or O'Kelly (1777–1834) was an Irish clergyman of the Roman Catholic Church who served as the Archbishop of Tuam from 1815 to 1834.

Born in Curramore, Ireland, in 1777, educated at Lawrence Duffy's School (Peterswell), going to Salamanca to study for the priesthood in 1795, he was ordained to the priesthood in 1800. He was the Vicar Capitular of the Archdiocese of Tuam, before being appointed Archbishop of Tuam by papal brief on 4 October 1814. He was consecrated on 12 March 1815 by the Most Reverend John Thomas Troy, Archbishop of Dublin, with the Most Reverend Daniel Murray, Coadjutor Archbishop of Dublin and the Most Reverend Kyran Marum, Bishop of Ossory, serving as co-consecrators. He was responsible for the building of the Cathedral Church of the Assumption of the Blessed Virgin Mary, Tuam.

He died in office at Albano Laziale on 18 April 1834, aged 57, and was buried at the Sacred Congregation for the Propagation of the Faith in Rome. His sister Mary Kelly married and moved to the United States; two of her sons became priests, and one of her daughters, Euphemia Blenkinsop, became Mother Superior of the Sisters of Charity in Emmitsburg, Maryland.

References

1777 births
1834 deaths
People from County Galway
Religion in Tuam
Roman Catholic archbishops of Tuam